Madrasa Al Jassoussia is one of the madrasahs of the medina of Tunis.

Etymology 
The madrasa's name comes from the saint Abi Abdallah Al Jassous.

Location 
It is located near the mausoleum of Sidi Abou El Ghaith Al Kachech, the Sheikh of the people of Andalusian descent in Tunis, in Souk El Blat.

History 
The madrasa is mostly known as Madrasa Al Dassoussia since the word Al Jassous, which means "spy" could also be pronounced dassous in the dialect of Tunis. This name came up in 1876 (1293 Hijri).

It is believed that a Husainid prince dedicated eight shops located at Al Azzaine as waqf to cover the financial needs of this madrasa, which was dedicated to students of the Maliki Islamic school.

Bibliography

References 

Jassoussia